Michael Connolly (born 1855, date of death unknown) was a United States Navy sailor and a recipient of the United States military's highest decoration, the Medal of Honor.

Biography
Born in 1855 in Boston, Massachusetts, Connolly joined the Navy from that state. On that day, while Plymouth was in Halifax Harbor, Nova Scotia, he rescued a civilian from drowning. For this action, he was awarded the Medal of Honor weeks later, on August 24. He deserted from the Navy the next month, and nothing is known from him after his desertion. 

Connolly's official Medal of Honor citation reads:
On board the U.S.S. Plymouth, Halifax Harbor, Nova Scotia, 7 August 1876. Acting gallantly, Connolly succeeding in rescuing a citizen from drowning on this date.

See also

List of Medal of Honor recipients in non-combat incidents

References

External links

1855 births
Year of death missing
People from Boston
United States Navy sailors
United States Navy Medal of Honor recipients
Non-combat recipients of the Medal of Honor